Andrew Hulshult is an American video game music composer and sound designer. He is best known for his work with 3D Realms as well as his scores for several first-person shooters, such as Dusk, Quake Champions, and Doom Eternal.

Career 
Hulshult is based in Dallas, Texas, where he has lived since childhood. He started in the industry composing for a Duke Nukem 3D remake that would eventually be canceled. Interceptor Entertainment CEO Frederik Schreiber wanted a heavy metal soundtrack for the game and described Hulshult's demos as "by far the best they had received." That relationship eventually led to Hulshult scoring the 2013 remake of Rise of the Triad. After Interceptor merged with 3D Realms, he continued with the company on several 3D Realms releases including Bombshell and Rad Rodgers.

Hulshult independently created remakes for classic video game tracks from games such as Quake II and Doom, the latter of which was attached to the Brutal Doom mod by Marcos "Sergeant_Mark_IV" Abenante.  The mod won the IGN SXSW 2017 award for "Fan Creation of the Year", and Hulshult accepted for Sergeant_Mark_IV, who wasn't able to attend.

Hulshult also continued his association with Rise of the Triad collaborator Dave Oshry, who became CEO of New Blood Interactive. The company published Dusk and later Amid Evil, both of which featured scores composed by Hulshult.

In July 2018, Bethesda announced that a new in-game soundtrack for Quake Champions had been made by "the sweet metal Viking Andrew Hulshult." The update went live a few weeks later.

In November 2018, the indie game Prodeus was announced, and by the March 2019 Kickstarter campaign Hulshult had been brought on for the soundtrack.

In an August 2020 interview with Bethesda Germany, Doom Eternal directors Marty Stratton and Hugo Martin disclosed that they had selected local Texas artists Andrew Hulshult and David Levy as composers for The Ancient Gods DLC, with Hulshult having been frequently requested by fans.  Hulshult confirmed the announcement.

Works

References

External links 

Video game composers
Living people
1988 births